Ballot Initiative 937 (official name Initiative measure no. 937, known as I-937) is a clean energy initiative passed in the US state of Washington, appearing on the ballot in the November 2006 elections. It passed with 52 percent of the vote.

Content of the proposal
The initiative requires large utilities to obtain 15% of their electricity from new renewable resources such as solar and wind (but excluding hydro) by 2020 with incremental steps of 3% by 2012 and 9% by 2016. It also requires that utilities undertake all cost-effective energy conservation.

Precedents
Similar legislation has been enacted in at least 20 other states including the following. (The table is sorted by date and then by descending percentage. I-937 is included in bold.)

Unless indicated otherwise, data are from

Supporters
Supporters included the following:

Elected officials
 U.S. Senators Maria Cantwell and Patty Murray
 U.S. Congressmen Jay Inslee, Adam Smith, Norm Dicks and Jim McDermott
 State Senators Luke Esser (R), Dave Schmidt (R), Debbie Regala (D), Bill Finkbeiner (R), Erik Poulsen (D), Karen Fraser (D), Craig Pridemore (D), Jeanne Kohl-Welles (D), Karen Keiser (D)
 State Representatives Toby Nixon (R), Zach Hudgins (D), Brian J. Sullivan (D), Fred Jarrett (R), Pat Sullivan (D), Geoff Simpson (D), Rodney Tom (D), Dave Upthegrove (D), Brendan Williams (D)
 King County Executive Ron Sims
 Seattle Mayor Greg Nickels

Civic and political organizations
 League of Women Voters
 Kittitas Valley League of Women voters
 Washington State Democrats
 King County Young Democrats
 Republicans for Environmental Protection, Washington Chapter
 Green Party of Washington State
 Peace Action for Washington

Health organizations
 American Lung Association
 American Cancer Society
 Washington Physicians for Social Responsibility

Energy and labor
 Washington Public Utility Districts Association
 Washington State Labor Council
 United Steelworkers
 SEIU Washington State Council

Environmental
 Denis Hayes, Founder of Earth Day
 NW Energy Coalition
 Audubon Society Washington
 The Mountaineers
 Sierra Club - Cascade Chapter
 Washington Conservation Voters
 Union of Concerned Scientists
 Natural Resources Defense Council
 National Wildlife Federation

Faith
 Earth Ministry
 Lutheran Public Policy Office of Washington
 Washington Association of Churches
 Church Council of Greater Seattle

Newspapers
 The Seattle P-I
 The Olympian
 The Tacoma News Tribune
 The Stranger

Opponents
Opponents included many small co-op electrical providers (even though the initiative affects only utilities with greater than 25,000 customers) as well as the following: 
  Big Bend Electrical Cooperative
 Boeing 
 Boise Cascade 
 Chamber of Commerces: Bellevue, Greater Seattle, Kelso-Longview, Pasco, Spokane Regional, Tacoma-Pierce County, Wenatchee Valley, West Richland Area
  Modern Electric Water Company
 National Association of Manufacturers
  Peninsula Light Company
 PUDs of Benton, Cowlitz, Franklin, Lewis, and Mason County.
 Representatives Brian Blake (D) and Dean Takko 
 Senators Jean Berkey (D) and Mark L. Doumit (D)
  Tanner Electric Cooperative
 U.S. Chamber of Commerce 
 Washington Farm Bureau
  Washington Rural Electric Cooperative Association
 Weyerhaeuser

References

External links
 Washington’s Primary Energy Consumption by Source (.doc)

Renewable energy policy in the United States
2006 Washington (state) ballot measures
Initiatives in the United States